Holly is a genus of about 400 species of flowering plants in the family Aquifoliaceae.

Holly may also refer to:

Name
 Holly (name), including a list of people with the name

Places in the United States 
 Holly, Colorado, a Statutory Town
 Holly, Michigan, a village
 Holly, Texas, an unincorporated community
 Holly, Washington, an unincorporated community
 Holly, West Virginia, an unincorporated community
 Holly Lake, Grand Teton National Park, Wyoming
 Holly River, Virginia
 Holly Township (disambiguation), several places

Arts, entertainment, and media

Fictional characters
 Holly (Red Dwarf), the talking computer on the British TV series Red Dwarf
 Holly Gibney, recurring character in Stephen King's novels
 Holly Golightly (character), lead character in Truman Capote's novella Breakfast at Tiffany's and its various adaptations
 Holly Flax, Human Resources representative and Michael Scott's love interest in American TV series The Office
 Holly Maddox, June Osborne's mother introduced in season 2 of the series The Handmaid's Tale

Music
 Holly (DJ), Portuguese musician
 Holly (album), an album by Justin Nozuka
 "Holly" (song), a 1967 song performed by Andy Williams
 Sirius XM Holly, a Christmas music channel on North American satellite radio which replaces various channels during the Christmas season including Sirius XM Love

Other uses in arts, entertainment, and media
 Holly (film), a 2006 drama film starring Ron Livingston and Chris Penn
 "Holly" (The Handmaid's Tale), a television episode

Brands and enterprises
 Holly (automobile company), a defunct American automobile manufacturer (1911–1913)
 Holly Corporation, an oil company headquartered in Dallas, Texa, now known as HollyFrontier
 Holly Theatre (disambiguation), several places

Education
 Holly Academy, Holly, Michigan, a charter school
 Holly High School, Holly, Michigan

Other uses
 Tropical Storm Holly, various named tropical cyclones
 , two US Navy vessels

See also
 Olly (disambiguation)
 Holley (disambiguation)
 Hollie (disambiguation)
 Hollies (disambiguation)
 Mount Holly (disambiguation)